Impact Theatre Co-operative was an experimental theatre company founded in Leeds, England.  It was active between 1979 and 1986.

The company's work was a fusion of text, music, visual and performance art.

The company's major productions were:

Ice (1979)
The Undersea World of Erik Satie (1980)
Certain Scenes (1980)
Dämmerungsstrasse 55 (1981)
Useful Vices (1982)
No Weapons for Mourning (1983)
A Place in Europe (1983)
Songs of the Clay People (1984)
The Carrier Frequency (1985) – written with Russell Hoban
The core members of the company were:
Pete Brooks
Richard Hawley
Tyrone Huggins
Claire MacDonald
Graeme Miller
Steve Shill
Niki Johnson
Heather Ackroyd
Hugo Burnham (early founding member, before returning to Gang of Four)

Contemporary evaluations

In an interview published in 1987, Russell Hoban, who collaborated with Impact on The Carrier Frequency, said he had responded to a question (from Fiction Magazine in 1983) about the best piece of fiction he had seen that year, by talking about Impact's No Weapons for Mourning. He said in part "The distinction of No Weapons for Mourning has to do with a perceptual phenomenon of our time. ... the performance, not realistic, but hyperreal, has a syntax of image and sound, speech and movement ... These young artists effectively demonstrate that the circuitry originates not with computers but with the human mind, and it is there for survival as well as annihilation."

The legacy of Impact Theatre

Though Impact Theatre Cooperative disbanded in 1986, its creations - especially The Carrier Frequency – continue to be important in the history of devised and physical theatre. Frances Babbage, writing about a symposium held in connection with Stan's Cafe's recreation of The Carrier Frequency in 1999, said "Many companies since have cited Impact as a major inspiration, with The Carrier Frequency in particular achieving almost mythic status", while Alison Oddey mentions The Carrier Frequency in her book on devised theatre, Devising Theatre: A Practical and Theoretical Handbook

References

Theatre companies in Leeds
Theatre companies in the United Kingdom
Organizations established in 1979
1979 establishments in England
Organizations disestablished in 1986
1986 disestablishments in England